Gangsters is a board game about American organized crime syndicates in the 1920s that was published by Avalon Hill in 1992.

Description
Gangsters is a game for 2–4 players in which players are members of a gang in Prohibition-era Chicago. In order to win, players amass money from extortion and other crimes, then buy properties and bribe cops.

Components
The game contains
 a 22" x 16" board
 4 player aid cards
 die-cut cardboard counters and pawns
 8-page rule book
 five different colored dice (black, red, green, blue, and white)
 40 pieces of play currency in various denominations
 1 movement pawn
 1 squirt gun

Gameplay
Each turn, the active player may 
 Buy a property (which then becomes the player's "Joint"), or may improve a previously purchased Joint, or may trade a Joint to another player.
 Bribe or move cops
 Move gang members
 Recruit new gang members
 Collect money earned by gang members
 Resolve any shootouts

Victory conditions
In the Basic Game, a player wins when the player's gang has at least one Racketeer, one Vamp, and one Thug, and the player has also met any one of three conditions:
 The player controls all properties of one color, or
 The player controls ten Joints, or
 The player has accumulated $10,000

Optional rules: 5-player game
A fifth player can join the game as the corrupt Police Commissioner, and can win the game by accumulating $10,000 and having control of one loyal Cop.

Publication history
Gangsters was designed by Don Greenwood and published by Avalon Hill in 1992. The board was designed by Charles Kibler, the marker art by Dave Dobyski, and the box cover art by George Parrish Jr.

Reviews
In the September 1993 edition of Dragon (Issue #197), Allen Varney commented, "I don’t like seeing criminals glamorized; that said, this design shows a charm and excitement independent of its subject. Don Greenwood has designed games for the Avalon Hill Game Company for about as long as I’ve breathed. Enjoy this tasty fruit of his long experience."

References

Avalon Hill games
Board games introduced in 1992